Treklyano Island is an island off the northeast coast of Robert Island, South Shetland Islands Extending , with a low rocky formation projecting  northeastwards, the island emerged as a distinct geographical entity following the retreat of Robert Island's ice cap in the late 20th century.  Named after the settlement of Treklyano in western Bulgaria.

Location

See also 

 Composite Antarctic Gazetteer
 List of Antarctic islands south of 60° S
 SCAR
 Territorial claims in Antarctica

Maps
 L.L. Ivanov. Antarctica: Livingston Island and Greenwich, Robert, Snow and Smith Islands. Scale 1:120000 topographic map.  Troyan: Manfred Wörner Foundation, 2009.

Notes

References
 Treklyano Island. SCAR Composite Antarctic Gazetteer
 Bulgarian Antarctic Gazetteer. Antarctic Place-names Commission. (details in Bulgarian, basic data in English)

External links
 Treklyano Island. Adjusted Copernix satellite image

Islands of Robert Island
Bulgaria and the Antarctic